Sex Bomb Baby is a compilation album by Flipper. It contains singles, B-sides, and compilation tracks from 1979 to 1982.

Critical reception
Dave Thompson, in Alternative Rock, called Sex Bomb Baby a "crucial round-up of singles and compilation cuts." Likewise, The Rough Guide to Rock considered it an "excellent introduction" to the band, and advised seeking out the original release for its artwork.

Track listing

"Sex Bomb" - 5:19
"Love Canal" - 3:59
"Ha Ha Ha" - 2:19
"Sacrifice" (live) - 4:37
"Falling" (live) - 5:37 (bonus track on 1995 reissue)
"Ever" (live) - 2:42
"Get Away" - 2:57
"Earthworm" - 3:07
"The Game's Got a Price" - 1:59
"The Old Lady Who Swallowed the Fly" - 5:31
"Brainwash" - 6:45
"Lowrider" (live) - 3:22 (bonus track on 1995 reissue)
"End of the Game" (live) - 2:40 (bonus track on 1995 reissue)

Notes:
Tracks 1 & 11 from "Sex Bomb" 7-inch single
2 & 3 from "Love Canal" 7-inch single
4 from Not So Quiet on the Western Front compilation
6 from Eastern Front compilation
7 & 10 from "Get Away" 7-inch single
8 from SF Underground compilation 7-inch EP
9 from a Take It magazine flexidisc
5, 12 & 13 from Live at Target compilation (added as bonus tracks on 1995 reissue)

Personnel (incomplete)
 Bruce Loose: vocals on tracks 2,3,4,6,8,9,10,11,12,13; bass on tracks 1,5,7
 Will Shatter: bass on tracks 2,3,4,6,8,9,10,11,12,13; vocals on tracks 1,5,7
 Ted Falconi: guitar on all tracks
 Steve DePace: drums on all tracks

References

1988 compilation albums
Subterranean Records albums
Domino Recording Company compilation albums
Flipper (band) albums